Komanapalle is a village in Konaseema district of the Indian state of Andhra Pradesh. It is located in Mummidivaram Mandal of Amalapuram revenue division.

References 

Villages in Mummidivaram mandal